The Perth SpeedDome is a velodrome in Midvale, Western Australia, Australia. It is Western Australia's only indoor velodrome. It was designed by German architect Ralph Schürmann and constructed under the supervision of English velodrome specialist Ron Webb. The SpeedDome was opened in November 1989, replacing the Lake Monger Velodrome, an old outdoor concrete velodrome in Mount Hawthorn.

The SpeedDome hosted the 1997 UCI Track Cycling World Championships, as well as the annual Perth International Track Cycling Grand Prix. It regularly hosts training camps for Great Britain, Netherlands, Japan and New Zealand track cycling teams.

It has seats for 1,500 people with facilities available for up to 2,300 people. In the centre of the cycling track is a multipurpose concrete floor used for inline hockey, figure, speed skating and roller derby. A purpose-built kick boxing gymnasium is located underneath the cycling track. Additional facilities include three media boxes, tenant and administration offices, competitors reception area and competitor and officials change rooms.

The complex also has a 700-metre outdoor criterium track, incorporating a bicycle training facility.

References

External links

Indoor arenas in Australia
Sports venues in Perth, Western Australia
Velodromes in Australia
1989 establishments in Australia
Sports venues completed in 1989